Linngithigh (Liningitij) is an extinct Paman language formerly spoken on the Cape York Peninsula of Queensland, Australia, by the Linngithigh people.  It is very similar phonologically to the closely related Alngith.

References 

Northern Paman languages
Extinct languages of Queensland